Silver Circle is a 2013 American computer-animated thriller film. Set in a dystopian future, it follows a group called the Rebels, who have vowed to take down the Federal Reserve.

Silver Circle was given a limited release in the United States on March 22, 2013. The film drew criticism for its libertarian slant and for the quality of its animation.

Reception

Critical response 
On Rotten Tomatoes, the film has an approval rating of 0% based on 6 reviews. On Metacritic, the film has a score of 21 out of 100 based on 6 critics, indicating "generally unfavorable reviews."

References

External links
 
 
 
 

2013 films
Animated thriller films
2010s thriller films
2013 computer-animated films
American thriller films
2010s American animated films
American independent films
American political thriller films
American dystopian films
2013 directorial debut films
2010s English-language films